Nikolayevsky is a rural locality (a settlement) in Karaulinsky Selsoviet, Kamyzyaksky District, Astrakhan Oblast, Russia. The population was 107 as of 2010. There is 1 street.

Geography 
Nikolayevsky is located 27 km south of Kamyzyak (the district's administrative centre) by road. Zaton is the nearest rural locality.

References 

Rural localities in Kamyzyaksky District